John Gregory Bishop Adams (October 6, 1841 – October 19, 1900) was an American soldier who received the Medal of Honor for his actions during the American Civil War.

Biography
John was born on October 6, 1841 in Groveland, Massachusetts, to Isaac and Margaret Adams. He married Mary E. on April 5, 1866 in Boston. They had two children, but they both died in infancy.

Adams enlisted into military service as a private and eventually achieved the rank of captain. During his Civil War service he fought in several major battles including Antietam, Fredericksburg, Chancellorsville and Gettysburg. It was during the Battle of Fredericksburg that his actions would earn him the United States military's highest decoration for valor, the Medal of Honor. During the battle of Cold Harbor his entire regiment was captured and held as prisoners in a Confederate prison camp where he was held for nine months.

When he returned home after the war, he worked a series of jobs including working for a shoe company, a customs inspector, postmaster and deputy warden.

Civil War service
Adams was born October 6, 1841 in Groveland, Massachusetts, and when the Civil War broke out, he enlisted as a private in Major Ben Perley Poore's Rifle Battalion, a unit that was later folded into the 19th Massachusetts Infantry Regiment. When the 19th departed the state on March 1, 1861, Adams was a corporal in Company A.

He served with the 19th in the Peninsula Campaign and at the Battle of Antietam. During the seven days' fighting on the Peninsula he was conspicuous for his bravery, and at its close his gallantry had won for him a Second Lieutenant's commission. While serving as a Second Lieutenant in Company I, he was one of 18 Union soldiers who received the Medal of Honor for valor at the Battle of Fredericksburg. Adams recovered the regimental and national colors as a corporal and a lieutenant carrying them fell mortally wounded. With a flag in each hand he advanced, and the regiment was reformed on him. He was one of seven soldiers from the 19th Regiment who received the Medal of Honor during the war.

Late, he was fighting at the Battle of Chancellorsville and the Battle of Gettysburg, where he was severely wounded on July 2, 1863; in this battle Adams was the ranking First Lieutenant in his regiment and took command of Company I. After Gettysburg he was promoted captain, and during the Wilderness campaign of 1864 he served with distinguished bravery. His convalescence was relatively brief and he was able to return and fight at Battle of the Wilderness, Battle of Spotsylvania Court House, and the Battle of Cold Harbor. He and the entire regiment were captured near Cold Harbor on June 22, 1864 and Adams was held at Libby Prison in Richmond, Virginia. He was also imprisoned at Macon, Georgia, and Charleston, South Carolina, where he and other officers were placed on Morris Island in an attempt to stop naval bombardment by the Union. Moved to Columbia, he and a comrade attempted to escape but were eventually captured. He was held for a total of nine months.

Postwar life
After the war, Adams was a foreman for ten years at the B. F. Doak & Company shoe factory in Lynn, Massachusetts. He left that post to become an inspector in the Boston Custom House and later served as the Postmaster of Lynn and Deputy Warden of the State Reformatory at Concord. He served as an elector for the state in the 1868 presidential election. In 1885 he was elected Sergeant at Arms for the Massachusetts legislature, overseeing a staff of approximately forty and earning a salary of $3,000.

Adams was a Freemason as a member of Columbian Lodge A.F.&A.M. in Boston, and a member of the Grand Army of the Republic. He joined the G.A.R. as the first member of General Frederick W. Lander Post No. 5 in Lynn, his local post. He served as a delegate to the national G.A.R. convention twelve times and served a year as Department Commander before being elected as Commander-in-Chief in 1893. At the time, he was elected he had been President of the Association of the Survivors of Rebel Prisons for seven years.  He was also a member of the Massachusetts Commandery of the Military Order of the Loyal Legion of the United States.

In 1899, he published a memoir of his war service, Reminiscences of the Nineteenth Massachusetts Regiment. He died October 19, 1900 and is buried in Pine Grove Cemetery in Lynn, Massachusetts.

Medal of Honor citation
Rank and organization: Second Lieutenant, Company I, 19th Massachusetts Infantry. Place and date: At Fredericksburg, Va., December 13, 1862. Birth: Groveland, Mass. Date of issue: December 16, 1896.

Citation:

Seized the 2 colors from the hands of a corporal and a lieutenant as they fell mortally wounded, and with a color in each hand advanced across the field to a point where the regiment was reformed on those colors.

See also

 List of Medal of Honor recipients
 List of American Civil War Medal of Honor recipients: A–F
 G.A.R. Hall and Museum in Lynn, Massachusetts

References

Attribution

External links
 
 

American Civil War prisoners of war
United States Army Medal of Honor recipients
People of Massachusetts in the American Civil War
Union Army officers
1868 United States presidential electors
1841 births
1900 deaths
American Civil War recipients of the Medal of Honor
People from Groveland, Massachusetts
Grand Army of the Republic Commanders-in-Chief
Military personnel from Massachusetts